The Town Hall at Auvers is a painting by Vincent van Gogh, executed mid-July 1890. It is based on the view Van Gogh had when he stepped out on the street from the Auberge Ravoux, where he stayed.

Along with other canvases from his short period in Auvers-sur-Oise, such as The Church at Auvers and paintings of houses with thatched roofs, this painting seems reminiscent of scenes from the northern landscapes of Van Gogh's childhood and youth.

See also
List of works by Vincent van Gogh

References

External links
Van Gogh, paintings and drawings: a special loan exhibition, a fully digitized exhibition catalog from The Metropolitan Museum of Art Libraries, which contains material on this painting (see index)

Paintings by Vincent van Gogh
Paintings of Auvers-sur-Oise by Vincent van Gogh
1890 paintings